Megachile banksi is a species of bee in the family Megachilidae. It was described by Mitchell in 1930.

References

Banksi
Insects described in 1930